William Owen (born 23 March 1995 in Castle Rock, Colorado, US) is an American racing driver. He attended high school at Valor Christian High School prior to attending TCU for university. He currently competes in the World Endurance Championship with United Autosports.

Racing record

Career summary

† As Owen was a guest driver, he was ineligible to score championship points.* Season still in progress.

Motorsports career results

American open–wheel racing results

U.S. F2000 National Championship

Pro Mazda Championship

WeatherTech SportsCar Championship

† Points only counted towards the Michelin Endurance Cup, and not the overall LMP2 Championship.

Complete FIA World Endurance Championship results
(key) (Races in bold indicate pole position) (Races in italics indicate fastest lap)

Le Mans 24 Hours results

References

External links
  
 

1995 births
Living people
Racing drivers from Colorado
People from Castle Rock, Colorado
U.S. F2000 National Championship drivers
Indy Pro 2000 Championship drivers
24 Hours of Daytona drivers
WeatherTech SportsCar Championship drivers
24 Hours of Le Mans drivers

SCCA National Championship Runoffs participants
Toyota Racing Series drivers
FIA World Endurance Championship drivers
European Le Mans Series drivers
Juncos Hollinger Racing drivers
AFS Racing drivers
United Autosports drivers